K M Mosharraf Hossain (born 22 August 1971), known by his stage-name Mosharraf Karim, is a Bangladeshi actor, works both in films and television. He began working as a theater artist in late the 1980s with "Nattokendro", where he has played lead roles in many popular theatre productions for 16 years continuously. He emerged on the television dramas in 1999, with the single-episode TV play Atithi, directed by Ferdous Hasan and rose to fame for his natural acting and expressions. He has collaborated several times with actor Chanchal Chowdhury.

Karim was associated with "Chabial" for a long time and worked with film and television director Mostofa Sarwar Farooki on several television series. His most notable works include Television, Third Person Singular Number, Vober Hat, 420, House Full, FnF, Mohanagar, 50-50, Oggatonama , Dour, Issac liton, Behind the trap, pera, jomoj

Karim was born to a Bengali family in Khilgaon. He expressed his acting skill developed through his early work in school theater. He passed secondary in 1986. In 1989, Karim participated in an audition initiated by Tariq Anam Khan and out of 1400 participants, 25 were selected and given the opportunity to work in the theater. Karim was one of them. Then he joined the theater troupe "Nattokendro" and worked for 16 years continuously. After over a decade in theater, Karim emerged on the small screen in 1999, with the single-episode TV play Atithi, directed by Ferdous Hasan and aired on Channel I. Mosharraf Karim has been a regular on the TV screen since February 2005. Towards the end of 2005, he suddenly changed his name from Mosharraf Hossain to Mosharraf Karim. According to him, the surname, Karim, was taken from his father’s name.

Career
In 2004, Karim played two important roles in two different television works. One of those roles included the popular telefilm Kyarom, where he performed with co-artist Nusrat Imroz Tisha. Before starring in the play Kyarom, Mosharraf Karim played the central role in only one play. That was 'Hefaz Bhai' directed by Syed Awlad.

In 2009, Karim acted in his first film Third Person Singular Number, with co-artist Nusrat Imroz Tisha. He acted in his first drama serial 420 aired on Channel I. Anik was the main star. After this, he worked in the two drama serials, Vober Hat and Ghor Kutum. Karim also acted in the 2007 film, Daruchini Dip, which was directed by Tauquir Ahmed.

Works

Film

NTV series and telefilms

Web series

Awards and nominations

References

External links
 
 Mosharraf Karim on BMDb

1971 births
Living people
Bengali male actors
Bangladeshi male television actors
Bangladeshi male film actors
Male web series actors
Best Performance in a Comic Role National Film Award (Bangladesh) winners